is a passenger railway station located in the city of Matsuyama, Ehime, Japan. It is operated by JR Shikoku and has the station number "Y47".

Lines
Connections with other local or limited express trains are needed to travel further east or west along the line.

Layout
The station consists of a straight track and a passing loop. Only the passing loop is served by the single side platform which the straight track is used by trains which do not stop at the station. There is no station building, only a shelter on the platform for waiting passengers. A ramp leads from the access road to the platform.

Adjacent stations

History
 was opened by JR Shikoku on 21 November 1990 on the Yosan Line. It was upgraded to a passenger station on 16 March 1991.

Surrounding area
Japan National Route 198.

See also
 List of railway stations in Japan

References

External links
Station timetable

Railway stations in Ehime Prefecture
Railway stations in Japan opened in 1991
Yosan Line
Railway stations in Matsuyama, Ehime